The Liga Nacional de Hockey Chilena is one association of Roller Hockey Clubs in Chile.
The Liga Nacional de Hockey Chilena is divided in three tournaments:
 Torneo Apertura (Open Tournament)
 Torneo Clausura (Close Tournament)
 Liga de Honor Apertura (Open Honor League) 
 Liga de Honor Clausura (Close Honor League)

Participated Teams in the last Season

List of Winners

Number of Championships by team

External links

Chilean websites
Federación Chilena de Hockey y Patinaje  
Hockey Patín Chileno website
Liga Nacional de Hockey
Leon Prado
Universidad de Chile
Thomas Bata
Club Deportivo Universidad Católica
Club Deportivo Hockey USACH

International
 Roller Hockey links worldwide
 Mundook-World Roller Hockey
Hardballhock-World Roller Hockey
Inforoller World Roller Hockey 
 World Roller Hockey Blog
rink-hockey-news - World Roller Hockey

 Roller Hockey
Roller hockey competitions in Chile
Chile